Dolphin Juice was a comedy radio show broadcast from 9 to 11pm Sunday nights on Triple M Sydney. It was hosted by Bernie Tingles and Barry Goldwater. There is also a TV version of the show featured on Television Sydney.

Australian radio programs